Bono Township is one of nine townships in Lawrence County, Indiana, United States. As of the 2010 census, its population was 833 and it contained 393 housing units.

History
The Bono Archaeological Site was listed in the National Register of Historic Places in 1985.

Geography

Unincorporated towns
 Bono at 
 Lawrenceport at 
 Rivervale at 
 Stonington at

Cemeteries
The township contains Talbott Cemetery.

Major highways
  Indiana State Road 60

Demographics

Education
 Mitchell Community Schools

Bono Township residents may obtain a free library card from the Mitchell Community Public Library in Mitchell.

Political districts
 Indiana's 4th congressional district
 State House District 62
 State Senate District 44

References
 
 United States Census Bureau 2008 TIGER/Line Shapefiles
 IndianaMap

External links
 Indiana Township Association
 United Township Association of Indiana
 City-Data.com page for Bono Township

Townships in Lawrence County, Indiana
Townships in Indiana